Emeka Ike (born 22 March 1967) is a Nigerian actor. He was a special guest in Monrovia on the occasion of the commissioning of the new pavilion of Center for Democratic Change CDC, in Liberia.

Emeka Ike is known for A Million Tears 2 (2006), I Swear (2004) and A Million Tears (2006).

Filmography
After My Heart
Test My Heart
Strength of a woman
A Can of Worms
Love Affair
Stigma
 My Love
Secret Act
Housemates and the man
The Snake Girl
My Last Wedding
Heavy Battle
Wind of Love
100 Days in the Jungle
Not Man Enough
Felony 
Day break
Working for Love
Under Pressure

See also 

 List of Nigerian actors

References

External links

Living people
21st-century Nigerian male actors
20th-century Nigerian male actors
Place of birth missing (living people)
1967 births
Igbo actors
Nigerian male television actors
People from Imo State